The 1945 Chicago White Sox season was the White Sox's 45th season in the major leagues, and their 46th season overall. They finished with a record of 71–78, good enough for 6th place in the American League, 15 games behind the 1st place Detroit Tigers.

Regular season

Season standings

Record vs. opponents

Opening Day lineup 
 Wally Moses, RF
 Oris Hockett, CF
 Johnny Dickshot, LF
 Bill Nagel, 1B
 Tony Cuccinello, 3B
 Roy Schalk, 2B
 Cass Michaels, SS
 Mike Tresh, C
 Thornton Lee, P

Roster

Player stats

Batting 
Note: G = Games played; AB = At bats; R = Runs scored; H = Hits; 2B = Doubles; 3B = Triples; HR = Home runs; RBI = Runs batted in; BB = Base on balls; SO = Strikeouts; AVG = Batting average; SB = Stolen bases

Pitching 
Note: W = Wins; L = Losses; ERA = Earned run average; G = Games pitched; GS = Games started; SV = Saves; IP = Innings pitched; H = Hits allowed; R = Runs allowed; ER = Earned runs allowed; HR = Home runs allowed; BB = Walks allowed; K = Strikeouts

External links 
 1945 Chicago White Sox at Baseball Reference

Chicago White Sox seasons
Chicago White Sox season
Chicago White